The hundred  of Kerrier was the name of one of ten ancient administrative shires of Cornwall, in the United Kingdom. Kerrier (sometimes Kirrier) is thought by Charles Thomas to be derived from an obsolete name (ker hyr = long fort) of Castle Pencaire on Tregonning Hill, Breage. It is likely that an even earlier name for the district was Predannack which has been displaced by the Lizard Peninsula as a geographical name.

Parishes in Kerrier hundred
St Anthony-in-Meneage, Breage, Budock, Constantine, Cury, Falmouth, Germoe, St Gluvias, Grade, Gunwalloe alias Winnington, Gwennap with St Day, Helston, St Keverne, Landewednack, Mabe, Manaccan, St Martin-in-Meneage, Mawgan-in-Meneage, Mawnan, Mullion, Mylor, Perranarworthal, Ruan Minor, and Ruan Major, Sithney, St Stithians, Wendron

Adjacent hundreds
Penwith Hundred (northwest)
Pydarshire Hundred (north)
Powdershire Hundred (northeast)

References

External links

Thomas Moule, The Hundred of Kerrier, 1838

History of Cornwall
Hundreds of Cornwall